Raden Roro Ayu Maulida Putri (born July 11, 1997) is an Indonesian People's Consultative Assembly Ambassador, National Head of Communication of the Indonesian COVID-19 Response Acceleration Task Force, fashion model and beauty pageant titleholder who won the title of Puteri Indonesia 2020.  Maulida is the third delegate from East Java to ever be crowned Puteri Indonesia after Putri Raemawasti in 2007 and Elvira Devinamira in 2014. She represented Indonesia at the Miss Universe 2020 pageant where she placed in the top 21, becoming the eighth and third consecutive Indonesian woman to place at the pageant.

Early life and background 

Born with the Javanese Royal Noble (Raden Roro ꦫꦢꦺꦤ꧀​ꦫꦺꦴꦫꦺꦴ), Maulida was raised in Surabaya with a Royal family tradition, She is the second child of three siblings. She works as a model since she was 14, She graduated three and a half years with a law degree from Airlangga University, Surabaya – East Java. In 2015, Maulida chosen as one of the Indonesian delegation on an exchange Model United Nations-trip program to Seoul, South Korea, 24th Harvard Model United Nations Conference.

On 12 March 2020 together with Puteri Indonesia 2020 Queens Putu Ayu Saraswati and Jihane Almira Chedid, Maulida elected as Indonesian People's Consultative Assembly Ambassador by the Speaker of the People's Consultative Assembly, Bambang Soesatyo. On 3 April 2020 together with Puteri Indonesia Lingkungan 2011 - Reisa Kartikasari, Maulida was selected as the National Head of Communication for the Indonesian COVID-19 Response Acceleration Task Force by the President of Indonesia - Joko Widodo in State Palace, coordinated by Indonesian National Board for Disaster Management, involves Ministry of Health, Indonesian National Police, and Indonesian Armed Forces.

Additionally, she also has organized charity works in the remote villages (desa) in the entire islands of Indonesia, with her own Non-governmental organization called #SenyumDesa (Smiling Village), with Airlangga University alumni as the volunteers. Helping the society with a vision to bring the smile from one remote village to another remote village through Gotong royong spirits, by bringing the advanced infrastructure development for education, healthcare, electricity access, and internet access.

Pageantry

Face of Indonesia 2019 
Before stepping into the field of pageantry, Maulida took part in "Face of Indonesia 2019" held by Indonesia Fashion Week 2019, the largest modeling event in Indonesia, the competition held on March 31, 2019, at Jakarta Convention Center – Jakarta, where she won the "Best Catwalk Female Model" award, an award given for the first time since its initial implementation in 6 years. By winning the title of "Face of Indonesia 2019", she gained the right to represent Indonesia to compete in the international competition, "Face of Asia 2019". She demonstrated clothing from designers such as Poppy Dharsono, Agnes Budisurya, Danjyo Hiyoji, Barli Asmara, Misan, Tethuna, and Lia Afif. Later in 2021, Maulida received the privileges to walk as a main guest star in Jakarta Fashion Week 2021, together with the reigning Puteri Indonesia 2020 Queens Putu Ayu Saraswati and Jihane Almira Chedid.

Face of Asia 2019 
On June 7, 2019, Maulida along with 4 other Indonesian representatives (Zian Alfin, Chealsea McKenzie, Joel Leo Pollock, and Alfrida Alifia) took part in the Face of Asia 2019 modeling contest held in Seoul, South Korea. She won the Face of Asia, titled "Grand Prize Winner" the highest title in the contest. She managed to surpass 74 other participants from 27 countries.

Puteri Indonesia East Java 2017 and 2020 
Maulida joined the contest at the provincial level of the Puteri Indonesia East Java 2017, but she failed to win the title, and ended as first runner-up after the contest was won by Fatma Ayu Husnasari from Blitar. In 2020, she returned to the same contest, and was chosen as the winner of Puteri Indonesia East Java 2020.

Puteri Indonesia 2020 
After qualifying the provincial title of Puteri Indonesia East Java 2020, Maulida represented the province of East Java in the national beauty contest, Puteri Indonesia 2020, which was held on March 6, 2020. She was successfully selected as the winner of Miss Universe Indonesia, and also won the special award for "Best in Traditional Costume" and "2nd Runner-up in Best in Evening Gown". The final coronation night was graced by the reigning Miss Universe 2019, Zozibini Tunzi and Miss Universe 2015, Pia Wurtzbach as the selection committee. During her finale night speech for Puteri Indonesia 2020, Maulida successfully raised her charity foundation called #SenyumDesa, which helps rural villagers across the islands of Indonesia. Maulida said:

Miss Universe 2020 
As the winner of Puteri Indonesia 2020, Maulida represented Indonesia at the 69th edition of Miss Universe 2020 pageant which was held on May 16, 2021, at Seminole Hard Rock Hotel & Casino in Hollywood, Florida, United States. At the finale, Maulida finished as one of the "Top 21 semifinalists".

Maulida brought a national costume with the Komodo dragon-inspired ensemble, the last link to Prehistoric-Dinosaurs that is endemic to the Indonesian islands of Komodo, Rinca, Flores, and Gili Motang. Weighing , the costume also features the beading metal plates resembling scales were intricately hand-stitched, 3D chest piece and dramatic tail were created using leather laser cutting, mechatronics of the Komodo dragon headdress, a light up choker and gloves created with a lighting control system.

See also 

 Puteri Indonesia 2020
 Miss Universe 2020
 Putu Ayu Saraswati
 Jihane Almira Chedid

References

External links

 

Living people
1997 births
Puteri Indonesia winners
Miss Universe 2020 contestants
Indonesian beauty pageant winners
Indonesian human rights activists
Indonesian female models
Indonesian film actresses
Indonesian activists
Indonesian Muslims
Child activists
Open access activists
Education activists
People from Surabaya
Javanese people
Airlangga University alumni